Events in the year 2022 in Nigeria.

Incumbents

Federal government 
 President: Muhammadu Buhari (APC)
 Vice President: Yemi Osinbajo (APC)
 Senate President: Ahmed Lawan (APC)
 House Speaker: Femi Gbajabiamila (APC)
 Chief Justice: Ibrahim Tanko Muhammad (Until 27 June); Olukayode Ariwoola (Starting 27 June)

Governors 

 Abia State: Okezie Ikpeazu (PDP)
 Adamawa State: Ahmadu Umaru Fintiri PDP
 Akwa Ibom State: Udom Gabriel Emmanuel PDP
 Anambra State: Willie Obiano (APGA) (Until 17 March); Charles Chukwuma Soludo (APGA) (Starting 17 March)
 Bauchi State: Bala Muhammed PDP
 Bayelsa State: Duoye Diri PDP
 Benue State: Samuel Ortom PDP
 Borno State: BabaGana Umara APC
 Cross River State: Benedict Ayade PDP
 Delta State: Ifeanyi Okowa PDP
 Ebonyi State: Dave Umahi PDP
 Edo State: Godwin Obaseki APC
 Ekiti State: Kayode Fayemi (APC) (Until 16 October); Biodun Oyebanji (APC) (Starting 16 October)
 Enugu State: Ifeanyi Ugwuanyi PDP
 Gombe State: Muhammad Inuwa Yahaya APC
 Imo State: Hope Uzodinma APC
 Jigawa State: Badaru Abubakar APC
 Kaduna State: Nasir Ahmad el-Rufai APC
 Kano State: Abdullahi Umar Ganduje APC
 Katsina State: Aminu Bello Masari APC
 Kebbi State: Abubakar Atiku Bagudu APC
 Kogi State: Yahaya Bello APC
 Kwara State: AbdulRahman AbdulRasaq APC
 Lagos State: Babajide Sanwo-Olu APC
 Nasarawa State: Abdullahi Sule APC
 Niger State: Abubakar Sani Bello APC
 Ogun State: Dapo Abiodun APC
 Ondo State: Oluwarotimi Odunayo Akeredolu APC
 Osun State: Adegboyega Oyetola (APC) (Until 27 November); Ademola Adeleke (PDP) (Starting 27 November)
 Oyo State: Oluwaseyi Makinde PDP
 Plateau State: Simon Lalong APC
 Rivers State: Ezenwo Nyesom Wike PDP
 Sokoto State: Aminu Waziri Tambuwal PDP
 Taraba State: Arch. Darius Ishaku PDP
 Yobe State: Mai Mala Buni APC
 Zamfara State: Bello Matawalle PDP

Events 
Ongoing – 2022 Nigeria floods, Boko Haram insurgency, COVID-19 pandemic in Nigeria, Herder-farmer conflicts in Nigeria, Insurgency in Southeastern Nigeria, Nigerian bandit conflict

January 
 4–6 January – 2022 Zamfara massacres
 14–15 January – Dankade massacre

February 
 5 February – 2022 Kebbi State local elections
 10 February
 Bandits raid the village of Rogoji, Bakura, Zamfara State, killing five people and causing a mass exodus from the town. The bandits were requested to do so by a woman whose son was killed by vigilantes.
 Armed robbers raid a bullion van in Ibadan, Oyo State, killing six people, including two policemen.
 12 February – 2022 Federal Capital Territory local elections
 23 February – 2022 Enugu State local elections

March 
 8 March – March 2022 Kebbi massacres
 12 March – 2022 Imo State local elections
 28 March – Abuja–Kaduna train attack

April 
 9 April – 2022 Adamawa State local elections
 10 April – 2022 Plateau State massacres
 11 April – 2022 Katsina State local elections
 19 April – 2022 Edo State local elections
 22 April – 2022 Imo-Rivers explosion

May 
 7 May – 2022 Benue State local elections
 12 May – Lynching of Deborah Yakubu
 28 May – 2022 Port Harcourt stampede

June 
 5 June – Owo church attack

July 
 16 July
 2022 Ekiti State gubernatorial election
 2022 Osun State gubernatorial election

August 
 7 August – The world-record holder in the women's 100m hurdles, Tobi Amusan broke a 16-year record in that event at the 2022 Commonwealth Games.
 31 August – One person is killed and six others are injured after a building collapse in Kano, Kano State.

September 

 5 September – Six people are killed after a building collapses in Lagos.
 12 September – Five people are killed during an attack on a senator's convoy in Anambra.
 21 September – Fulani herdsmen shoot and kill 14 civilians in Logo, Benue State.
 24 September – Fifteen people are killed and many others are injured after armed bandits attacked a mosque in Zamfara.

October 

 5 October – Abuja–Kaduna train attack: The Nigerian military says it has secured the release of the last 23 passengers taken hostage in late March.
 8 October – At least 76 people are killed after a boat carrying people fleeing floodwater capsizes in Anambra State.
 17 October – The death toll from the ongoing floods across Nigeria, which started in early summer, increases to more than 600.
 18 October – Multiple people are killed and 10 others are abducted after gunmen storm a hospital in Niger State.

November 

 8 November – Four people are killed and twelve others are injured by a bombing in Anambra State.
 11 November – Twelve people are killed when a tank truck explodes in Ofu, Kogi State.

December 

 7 December – The Central Bank of Nigeria says it will limit individual cash withdrawals to 100,000 Nigerian naira (225 USD) per week to reduce counterfeiting and to discourage ransom payments to kidnappers.
 20 December – Nigerian bandit conflict: At least 38 people are killed and several houses are torched during two attacks at two villages in Kagoro, Kaduna State.

 29 December – Fourteen people are killed and 24 more injured after a drunk driver ploughed into crowds at the annual carnival parade in Calabar.

Culture

January 
 1 January – Chief Daddy 2: Going for Broke released on Netflix

May 
 8 May – 8th Africa Magic Viewers' Choice Awards

Deaths 
 1 January –
 Paul Adegboyega Olawoore, Roman Catholic prelate, coadjutor bishop (2018–2019) and bishop (since 2019) of Ilorin.
 Anthony Obi, 69, politician, military administrator of Osun State (1996–1998).
2 January – Saliu Adetunji, 93, traditional ruler, Olubadan of Ibadan (since 2016).
3 January – Bashir Tofa, 74, Nigerian politician, MP (1977–1979)
 11 January – Ernest Shonekan, 9th Head of State.
 29 January – Ibrahim Naʼiddah, 68, Nigerian politician, MLA from Zamfara State.
 8 February – Abdulkadir Abubakar Rano, a major figure of the Nigeria Police Force.
 8 April – Osinachi Nwachukwu, 42, gospel singer (cause undisclosed)
14 April – Orlando Julius, 79, Afrobeat saxophonist, singer, bandleader, and songwriter
 22 April – Alaafin of Oyo, Lamidi Adeyemi III.
11 June – Amb Osayomore Joseph, 69, highlife pioneer
25 November – Sammie Okposo, 51, Nigerian gospel singer
15 December – Ademola Rasaq Seriki, 63, Nigerian politician, MP (1998–1999).
17 December – Sunday Tuoyo, 84, Nigerian military officer and politician, governor of Ondo State (1978–1979).

See also 

 2022 Nigerian elections
 2022 Census of Nigeria
 2022 in West Africa
 List of Nigerian films of 2022

References 

 
Nigeria
Nigeria
2020s in Nigeria
Years of the 21st century in Nigeria